Sezemice is a town in Pardubice District in the Pardubice Region of the Czech Republic. It has about 4,100 inhabitants.

Administrative parts
Villages of Dražkov, Kladina, Lukovna, Počaply, Velké Koloděje and Veská are administrative parts of Sezemice.

Geography
It lies on the Loučná River, in a flat landscape of the East Elbe Table lowland. The Labská pond is situated north of the town.

History
The first written mention of Sezemice is from 1227, when Kojata IV Hrabišic bequeathed the village to the Cistercian Sedlec Abbey. In the 13th century, a Cistercian convent was founded in Sezemice, who managed the village. However, the convent was destroyed during the Hussite Wars in 1421 and Sezemice was acquired by Diviš Bořek of Miletínek. In 1436, the village was looted and burned down.

In 1488, Sezemice was bought by Jan Anděl of Ronov and was first referred to as a market town. Between 1491 and 1559, it was a property of the Pernštejn family. In 1560, it was bought by Emperor Maximilian II. As a part of the Pardubice estate, Sezemice remained a property of Austrian emperors until 1863.

During the Thirty Years' War, Sezemice was burned down by the army of General Lennart Torstensson. The market town recovered, but was again damaged by fires in 1701, 1716 and 1732. Other trials for the market town were the Seven Years' War and epidemics of plague and cholera. Despite all the difficulties, Sezemice slowly grew, and was promoted to a town in 1834.

Notable people
Rudolf Havelka (1927–2007), speedway rider

Twin towns – sister cities

Sezemice is twinned with:
 Neuville-Saint-Vaast, France

Gallery

References

External links

Populated places in Pardubice District
Cities and towns in the Czech Republic